The 1963 Kuril Islands earthquake occurred at 05:17 UTC, on October 13. The earthquake had a magnitude of 8.5  and was followed by a  7.8 event seven days later. Both earthquakes triggered tsunamis that were observed around the northern part of the Pacific Ocean.

Tectonic setting
The Kuril Islands form part of the island arc formed above the subduction zone, where the Pacific Plate is being subducted beneath the North American Plate. This convergent boundary has been the site of many large megathrust earthquakes, including the second largest earthquake ever recorded.

Damage
No damage, deaths, or injuries were recorded for these two earthquakes or their associated tsunamis.

Characteristics

Earthquake
The earthquake was made up of three sub events, each of which is interpreted to represent the rupture of an asperity roughly 50 km in length along the subduction interface.

Tsunami
The tsunami triggered by the earthquake of October 13, caused a 4.5 m wave locally. The tsunami was also observed in Canada, Japan, Mexico, Hawaii, Alaska, California, and on many islands across the northern Pacific Ocean. The tsunami associated with the October 20 event was larger in the nearby area, with a maximum recorded run-up of 15 m at Urup, but was only observed in the western part of the northern Pacific.

See also
 1994 Kuril Islands earthquake
 2006 Kuril Islands earthquake
 2007 Kuril Islands earthquake
 List of earthquakes in 1963
 List of earthquakes in Japan
 List of earthquakes in Russia

References

External links

Kuril Islands
Kuril Islands earthquake
1963 tsunamis
October 1963 events in Asia
Megathrust earthquakes in the Soviet Union
Earthquakes of the Showa period
Megathrust earthquakes in Japan
Tsunamis in Russia
Tsunami earthquakes
Earthquakes in the Russian Far East